The 1970 FIFA World Cup qualification UEFA Group 5 was a UEFA qualifying group for the 1970 FIFA World Cup. The group comprised France, Norway and Sweden.

Standings

Matches

External links 
Group 5 Detailed Results at RSSSF

5
1968–69 in French football
1969–70 in French football
1968 in Norwegian football
1969 in Norwegian football
1968 in Swedish football
1969 in Swedish football